The Malaya and British Borneo dollar was the currency of Malaya, Singapore, Sarawak, North Borneo, Brunei and the Riau archipelago from 1953 to 1967 and was the successor of the Malayan dollar and Sarawak dollar, replacing them at par. The currency was issued by the Board of Commissioners of Currency, Malaya and British Borneo. Prior to 1952, the board was known as the Board of Commissioners of Currency, Malaya.

The Malaya and British Borneo dollar was used in Malaya after independence in 1957, and in Malaysia after its formation in 1963, as well as in Singapore after its independence in 1965. After 1967, the two countries and Brunei ended the common currency arrangement and began issuing their own currencies. However, the Malaya and British Borneo dollar continued to be legal tender until 16 January 1969. The currency was also being used in the Riau Archipelago in Indonesia prior to 1963.

History

Board of Commissioners of Currency Malaya and British Borneo

The Currency Ordinance No. 44 of 1952 of the Crown Colony of Singapore, No. 33 of 1951 of the Federation of Malaya, No. 10 of 1951 of North Borneo and No. 1 of 1951 of Sarawak implemented an agreement between those governments and the State of Brunei for the establishment of a Board of Commissioners of Currency to be the sole issuing authority in British Malaya and British Borneo.

This agreement became effective on 1 January 1952. The Board consisted of five members: 
 Financial Secretary of Singapore who was also the chairman of the Board
 Minister of Finance for the Federation of Malaya
 Governor of Sarawak
 Governor of North Borneo
 British Resident of Brunei
 and two further appointed by agreement of the participating governments.

End of common currency

On 12 June 1967, the currency union came to an end and Malaysia, Singapore and Brunei each began issuing their own currencies: the Malaysian dollar, Singapore dollar and Brunei dollar. The currencies of the three countries were interchangeable at par value under the Interchangeability Agreement until 8 May 1973 when the Malaysian government decided to terminate it. Brunei and Singapore continue with the Agreement until the present day.

The Board of Commissioners of Currency Malaya and British Borneo was officially wound up on 30 November 1979.

Coins
Coins were issued in bronze 1 cent square shaped coins issued between 1953 and 1961, and circular coins of similar composition from 1962, and cupro-nickel 5, 10, 20, and 50 cents. These all shared a similar basic design depicting Queen Elizabeth II on the obverse and denomination on the reverse. However, the Queen was replaced with two daggers on the smaller round cent of 1962. These coins carried the same design features and sizes from the coins of the previous Commissioner's Currency and Straits series, making them relatively unchanged in appearance except for the depictions of the British monarchs. The older coins also continued to circulate alongside these bearing the new title.

Banknotes

1953 series
All notes bear the date 21 March 1953, and signed by W.C. Taylor, the chairman of the Board of Commissioner of Currency. The 1, 5 and 10 dollar notes were printed by Waterlow and Sons, the 50 and 100 dollar notes were printed by Bradbury, Wilkinson & Co. Ltd. and the 1,000 and 10,000 dollar notes were printed by Thomas de la Rue & Co. Ltd. As a safeguard against forgery, a broken security thread and the watermark of a lion's head were incorporated in the paper before printing.

1959 series

See also 

 British North Borneo dollar
 Malayan dollar
 Sarawak dollar
 Straits dollar

References

Citations

Sources

External links 
Coins of Malaya and British Borneo
Global Financial Data currency histories table
Tables of modern monetary history: Asia

|-

|-

Dollar
Currencies of the Commonwealth of Nations
Obsolete currencies in Malaysian history
British Malaya
British Borneo
Economy of Brunei
Modern obsolete currencies
British rule in Singapore
Currencies of Brunei
Currencies of Malaysia
Currencies of Singapore
1953 establishments in Malaya
1967 disestablishments in Malaysia
Brunei–United Kingdom relations